The 2015–16 season was Paris Saint-Germain Football Club's 43rd professional season since its creation in 1970, and its 42nd consecutive season in the top-flight of French football.

Players
French teams are limited to four players without EU citizenship. Hence, the squad list includes only the principal nationality of each player; several non-European players on the squad have dual citizenship with an EU country. Also, players from the ACP countries—countries in Africa, the Caribbean, and the Pacific that are signatories to the Cotonou Agreement—are not counted against non-EU quotas due to the Kolpak ruling.

Current squad

.

Out on loan

Transfers

In

Out

Pre-season and friendlies

Competitions

Overall

Trophée des Champions

Ligue 1

League table

Results summary

Results by round

Matches

Coupe de France

Coupe de la Ligue

UEFA Champions League

Group stage

Knockout phase

Round of 16

Quarter-finals

Statistics

Appearances and goals

|-
! colspan="18" style="background:#dcdcdc; text-align:center"| Goalkeepers

|-
! colspan="18" style="background:#dcdcdc; text-align:center"| Defenders

|-
! colspan="18" style="background:#dcdcdc; text-align:center"| Midfielders

|-
! colspan="18" style="background:#dcdcdc; text-align:center"| Forwards

|-
! colspan="18" style="background:#dcdcdc; text-align:center"| Players transferred out during the season

|-

References

Paris Saint-Germain F.C. seasons
Paris Saint-Germain
Paris Saint-Germain
French football championship-winning seasons